Julius D. Canns (February 20, 1923 – February 20, 2005) was a Republican member of the Vermont State Senate, 1993–2005. He represented Caledonia County.

Julius Canns was first elected to the Vermont State Senate in 1992 and served until his death.

Biography
Canns was born in Hartford, Connecticut on February 20, 1923.  He attended elementary school in Bloomfield, Connecticut, and then the Haaren Aviation High School, in New York City.  He went on to receive a certificate of completion from New York University, training in electronics from Delehanty Institute, and an LLB from La Salle Extension University in 1965.

He was married to Mary Canns, and had one daughter and two sons.

In World War II he volunteered for the Marine Corps and served in the Pacific, attaining the rank of Gunnery Sergeant.

He resided in St. Johnsbury, Vermont at the time of his death.

He died on February 20, 2005, his 82nd birthday.

Public life
Canns held the following offices:

St. Johnsbury Grand juror.
St. Johnsbury Justice of the Peace.
Member St. Johnsbury select board (serving four years).
St. Johnsbury tax collector.
Caledonia County deputy sheriff.
Member Vermont State Senate. First elected 1992, served until his death (February 20, 2005).

Following Canns' death, Governor James Douglas appointed George R. Coppenrath to serve out the remainder of Canns' term.

See also
Members of the Vermont Senate, 2005-2006 session

External links
Vermont Senate Biographies
Resolution of condolences passed by the Vermont Legislature upon the death of Sen. Canns
Legislative record of the appointment of George R. Coppenrath as Canns' successor

1923 births
2005 deaths
Vermont state court judges
Vermont state senators
United States Marine Corps personnel of World War II
American deputy sheriffs
People from St. Johnsbury, Vermont
Tax collectors
20th-century American judges
United States Marine Corps non-commissioned officers
Military personnel from Hartford, Connecticut
20th-century American politicians
New York University alumni